Fabaeformiscandona aemonae is a species of ostracod crustacean in the Candonidae family. It is endemic to Slovenia.

References

Candonidae
Freshwater crustaceans of Europe
Crustaceans described in 1935
Endemic fauna of Slovenia
Taxonomy articles created by Polbot